Loyugesa is a genus of long-beaked fungus gnats in the family Lygistorrhinidae.

Species
Loyugesa khuati  Matile, 1990

References

Sciaroidea genera